State Route 75 (SR 75) is a  state highway in the U.S. state of Alabama that travels northeastward from Birmingham to the Georgia state line. The highway travels west of U.S. Route 11 (US 11) and roughly parallels that highway, as well as Interstate 59 (I-59). Other cities and towns along the highway include Center Point, Pinson, Oneonta, Albertville, Geraldine, and Rainsville.

Route description
SR 75 begins at an interchange with I-59 and US 11 at the intersection of Parkway East, Roebuck Drive, and Gadsden Road in eastern Birmingham. Until the 1990s, SR 75 overlapped US 11 along 1st Avenue North into downtown Birmingham, continuing to the intersection of the two highways with US 78.

Traveling up to SR-51 in  Pinson, the route travels along Roebuck Drive - a major thoroughfare for the far northeastern suburbs of Birmingham. Turning onto SR 151's right of way, the route continues as a four-lane divided highway into  Blount; although some short portions are undivided. Traversing its way into a mountain valley, the route passes through  Allgood and  Oneonta before losing two lanes (one in each direction) and becoming a traditional two-lane rural road.

Climbing up to the highs of  Sand Mountain just outside Oneonta, the route continues onward, serving several small communities in northern Blount County and southern  Marshall County, such as  Snead and  Douglas. It makes its way straight into downtown  Albertville before once again widening into a four-lane divided highway. 

Upon crossing the county line into  DeKalb County, the route narrows once again to two lanes as it winds along the mountainside. In  Fyffe, the route once again widens to a four-lane divided highway. About a mile from the city limits of  Rainsville, the route narrows again. Continuing onward up to the state line, the route serves several crossroads communities, such as  Henagar and  Ider.

History

In 1999, work was completed to widen SR 75 to four lanes into Oneonta.

Major intersections

See also

References

075
075
Transportation in Jefferson County, Alabama
Transportation in Blount County, Alabama
Transportation in Marshall County, Alabama
Transportation in DeKalb County, Alabama